Anti-Japanese sentiment in Korean society has its roots in historic, cultural, and nationalistic sentiments.

The first recorded anti-Japanese attitudes in Korea were effects of the Japanese pirate raids and the later 1592−98 Japanese invasions of Korea. Sentiments in contemporary society are largely attributed to the Japanese rule in Korea from 1910 to 1945. A survey in 2005 found that 89% of those South Koreans polled said that they "cannot trust Japan." More recently, according to a BBC World Service Poll conducted in 2013, 67% of South Koreans view Japan's influence negatively, and 21% express a positive view. This puts South Korea behind mainland China as the country with the second most negative feelings of Japan in the world.

Historical origins

Japanese invasions of Korea

During this time, the invading Japanese dismembered more than 20,000 noses and ears from Koreans and brought them back to Japan to create nose tombs as war trophies. In addition after the war, Korean artisans including potters were kidnapped by Hideyoshi's order to cultivate Japan's arts and culture. The abducted Korean potters played important roles to be a major factor in establishing new types of pottery such as Satsuma, Arita, and Hagi ware. This would soon cause tension between the two countries; leaving the Koreans feeling that a part of their culture was stolen by Japan during this time.

Effect of Japanese rule in Korea

Korea was ruled by the Japanese Empire from 1910 to 1945. Japan's involvement began with the 1876 Treaty of Ganghwa during the Joseon Dynasty of Korea and increased over the following decades with the Gapsin Coup (1882), the First Sino-Japanese War (1894–95), the assassination of Empress Myeongseong at the hands of Japanese agents in 1895, the establishment of the Korean Empire (1897), the Russo-Japanese War (1904–05), the Taft–Katsura Agreement (1905), culminating with the 1905 Eulsa Treaty, removing Korean autonomous diplomatic rights, and the 1910 Annexation Treaty (both of which were eventually declared null and void by the Treaty on Basic Relations between Japan and the Republic of Korea in 1965).

Japan's cultural assimilation policies

The Japanese annexation of Korea has been mentioned as the case in point of "cultural genocide" by Yuji Ishida, an expert on genocide studies at the University of Tokyo. The Japanese government put into practice the suppression of Korean culture and language in an "attempt to root out all elements of Korean culture from society."

After the annexation of Korea, Japan enforced a cultural assimilation policy. The Korean language was removed from required school subjects in Korea in 1936. Japan imposed the family name system along with civil law (Sōshi-kaimei) and attendance at Shinto shrines. Koreans were formally forbidden to write or speak the Korean language in schools, businesses, or public places. However, many Korean language movies were screened in the Korean peninsula. In addition, Koreans were angry over Japanese alteration and destruction of various Korean monuments including Gyeongbok Palace (경복궁, Gyeongbokgung) and the revision of documents that portrayed the Japanese in a negative light.

Independence movement

On March 1, 1919, anti-Japanese rule protests were held all across the country to demand independence. About 2 million Koreans actively participated in what is now known as the March 1st Movement. A Declaration of Independence, patterned after the American version, was read by teachers and civic leaders in tens of thousands of villages throughout Korea: "Today marks the declaration of Korean independence. There will be peaceful demonstrations all over Korea. If our meetings are orderly and peaceful, we shall receive the help of President Wilson and the great powers at Versailles, and Korea will be a free nation." Japan repressed the independence movement through military power. In one well attested incident, villagers were herded into the local church which was then set on fire. The official Japanese count of casualties include 553 killed, 1,409 injured, and 12,522 arrested, but the Korean estimates are much higher: over 7,500 killed, about 15,000 injured, and 45,000 arrested.

Comfort women
Many Korean women were kidnapped and coerced by the Japanese authorities into military sex slavery, euphemistically called "comfort women" (위안부, wianbu). Some Japanese historians, such as Yoshiaki Yoshimi, using the diaries and testimonies of military officials as well as official documents from Japan and archives of the Tokyo tribunal, have argued that the Imperial Japanese military was either directly or indirectly involved in coercing, deceiving, luring, and sometimes kidnapping young women throughout Japan's Asian colonies and occupied territories. In the case of recruiting Japanese comfort women(일본군위안소 종업부 등 모집에 관한건) (1938.3.4), the Ministry of Army records that the method of recruiting military "Japanese Military Sexual Slavery" in Japan was "similar to kidnapping" and was often misunderstood by the police as kidnappers.

Park Yu-ha, a Korean professor of Japanese language and literature at Seoul's Sejong University wrote a book titled Comfort Women of the Empire, in which she disputed the numbers of Korean comfort women. She interviewed many survivors and sifted through Japanese military records, and says there's some evidence some of the women were given labor contracts as prostitutes. Her book challenged the view that all of them were rape victims, and says there were Korean middle men, or collaborators, who helped traffic Korean women, leading to the book's censorship in Korea, and to Park being labeled a Japanese apologist and a traitor. She would later tell NPR "Nowadays, people think Japan came and raped and never gave compensation, but that's not totally accurate. I've been a victim of this anti-Japanese sentiment". South Korea's mainstream academic circle, which is critical of her, argues that she provides intellectual justification for Japanese historical revisionism and that her argument should be equated to Holocaust denial.

After declaring in 2015 that the comfort women issue had been resolved "finally and irreversibly", in 2019, the South Korean government dissolved the foundation (the Reconciliation and Healing Foundation) set up for the purpose of providing support for former comfort women to which Japan had contributed 1 billion yen, without consent from the Japanese government. A task force created by Moon Jae-in "criticized the previous administration for not doing more outreach to the surviving comfort women, and making too many concessions to the Japanese side."

Contemporary issues
According to Robert E. Kelly, a professor at Pusan National University, anti-Japanese racism in South Korea stems not just from Imperial Japanese atrocities during the colonial era, but from the Korean Peninsula's division. As most Koreans, north and south are racial nationalists, most South Koreans feel a kinship and racial solidarity with North Korea as a result. Due to this perceived racial kinship, it is considered bad form for a South Korean to hate North Korea, to run the risk of being called a race traitor. As a result, Kelly says, South Koreans take out the anger rising from Korean division against Japan. This view is supported by another professor, Brian Reynolds Myers of Dongseo University. On March 1, 2018, Lee Jae-myung said that Japan, the aggressive state (침략국가) should have been divided into two countries, but it was wrong to divide the Korean Peninsula, which has done nothing wrong instead of Japan. Lee said the division of Korean was an excuse for war.

However, it is controversial whether South Korea's 'anti-Japan sentiment' can be regarded as racism because many Koreans suffered from war crimes by the Japanese in World War II. South Korean liberals, including non-Korean race Japanese-born naturalized South Korean liberal scholar Yuji Hosaka and centre-left media Hankyoreh, argue that South Korea's anti-Japanese sentiment has nothing to do with racism. They argue that anti-Japanese and anti-Chinese sentiment in South Korea is mainly anti-imperialism stemming from conflicts related to history, politics and culture, and that race is not the main factor. Many Koreans believe that resistance-nationalism is necessary to counter strong powers such as China and Japan. Unlike Japan, there is no anti-Chinese/anti-Japanese racist hate group in South Korea like Zaitokukai. Korean language is different from English language, and tends to distinguish between "anti-Japanese" (반일) and "hate of Japanese" (혐일). The former ostracizes Japan in an anti-imperialistic and non-ethnic context, and the latter ostracizes Japan in all contexts, including race/ethnic.

According to a 2022 survey, racism against Japanese in South Korea is only accusations related to historical issues, and rarely discriminated against in everyday life, while racism against Vietnamese and Chinese from communist countries is more pronounced in South Korea.

Unification church, spiritual sales, and the assassination of Shinzo Abe 
The Unification Church (UC) is a new religion founded by Sun Myung Moon in Seoul in 1954; its missionaries began activities in Japan in 1958. The UC is accused of engaging in what is locally termed as "spiritual sales". The UC would tell their targets that they must donate to the church or they, or their relatives, either living or deceased, would be damned to hell. The UC demands their targets donate all of their savings, as well as selling their properties or applying for loans to make the payments. According to the National Network of Lawyers Against Spiritual Sales, an anti-cult lawyers group, the total confirmed financial damages linked to the UC during the 35 years through 2021 have surpassed 123.7 billion yen (899.2 million USD).

According to the Japanese lawyer Masaki Kito, who also represents the anti-cult lawyers group, the UC specifically targets the Japanese people because of the invasion of Korea by Japan. The UC would tell their target that "in order to atone for that sin, you must make contributions to Korea".

UC's practice of spiritual sales was widely reported by Japanese media as the primary cause which drove a gunman, whose mother went bankrupt due to her exorbitant donations for the church, to assassinate former prime minister Shinzo Abe on 8 July 2022.

Effects of sentiments

Society
A 2000 CNN ASIANOW article described popularity of Japanese culture among younger South Koreans as "unsettling" for older South Koreans who remember the occupation by the Japanese.

While some South Koreans expressed hope that former Japanese Prime Minister Yukio Hatoyama would handle Japanese-South Korean relations in a more agreeable fashion than previous conservative administrations, a small group of protesters in Seoul held an anti-Japanese rally on October 8, 2009, prior to his arrival. The protests called for Japanese apologies for World War II incidents and included destruction of a Japanese flag.

Due to the anti-imperialist sentiment of the South Korean people, South Korean TV dramas often portray Chinese and Japanese people negatively.

National relations
Yasuhiro Nakasone discontinued visits to Yasukuni Shrine due to the People's Republic of China's requests in 1986. However, former Japanese Prime Minister Junichiro Koizumi resumed visits to Yasukuni Shrine on August 13, 2001. He visited the shrine six times as Prime Minister, stating that he was "paying homage to the servicemen who died for defense of Japan." These visits drew strong condemnation and protests from Japan's neighbors, mainly China. As a result, China and South Korea refused to meet with Koizumi, and there were no mutual visits between Chinese and Japanese leaders after October 2001 and between South Korean and Japanese leaders after June 2005. Former President of South Korea Roh Moo-hyun suspended all summit talks between South Korea and Japan.

Education
A large number of anti-Japanese images made by school children from Gyeyang Middle School, many of which depicting acts of violence against Japan, were displayed in Gyulhyeon station as part of a school art project. A number of the drawings depict the Japanese flag being burned, bombed, and stepped on, in others the Japanese islands are getting bombed and destroyed by a volcano from Korea. One depicts the Japanese anime/manga character Sailor Moon holding up the South Korean flag with a quote bubble saying roughly "Dokdo is Korean land"

Politics
Political anti-Japanese sentiment in South Korean politics is more pronounced in the liberal-to-progressive camp than in the conservative camp.

In South Korea, "anti-Japanism" (반일주의) is considered 'political correctness' in a post-colonistic sense rather than 'racism'. "Anti-Japan" is perceived as moral and progress in South Korea, and "pro-Japan" tends to be considered a political 'far-right' (극우) in the sense of ignoring victims of past colonial times. South Korean liberals tend to be more pro-immigrant and more sensitive to racism (on all issues except the Japanese) than conservatives, but they tend not to be in matters related to racism to Japanese people. Some South Korean liberals and progressives use the term Tochak Waegu to criticize some conservatives.

The United States's ambassador to South Korea, Harry B. Harris Jr., who is of Japanese descent, has been criticized in the South Korean media for having a moustache, which his detractors say resembles those of the several leaders of the Empire of Japan. A CNN article written by Joshua Berlinger suggested that given Harris's ancestry, the criticism of his mustache may be due to racism. South Korean liberal media point out that Harry B. Harris Jr. had similar words and actions to the right-wing of Japan. On November 30, 2019, Harris verbally abused, saying, "There are many Jongbuk leftists around the president of Moon" (문 대통령 종북좌파에 둘러싸여 있다는데). On January 16, 2020, he was criticized by the Democratic Party of Korea for "interference in internal affairs" (내정 간섭) for saying that U.S. consultation was needed on tourism to North Korea. South Korean liberal media believe the attack on his beard is not racist because he attacked the South Korea's "national sovereignty" (주권) using rhetoric like "Japanese colonial governor" (일본 총독).

South Korea's centre-right newspaper JoongAng Ilbo published an article on August 23, 2020, positively evaluating the '1974 Mitsubishi Heavy Industries bombing' carried out by Japan's "anti-Japaneseist" far-left terrorist group EAAJAF. The article described the incident as "They tried to expose Japan's 'perpetrator state' identity and fight it with violence" ('가해국' 일본의 정체성을 들춰내며 폭력으로 싸우려 했던). This article does not criticize terrorism in the EAAJAF. Mitsubishi Heavy has a negative perception in South Korea because he cooperated in Japanese war crimes during World War II. Koreans were also mobilized for forced labor for the benefit of Japanese companies.

Chinilpa

In South Korea, collaborators to the Japanese occupation government, called Chinilpa (친일파), are generally recognized as national traitors. The South Korean National Assembly passed the special law to redeem pro-Japanese collaborators' property on December 8, 2005, and the law was enacted on December 29, 2005. In 2006, the National Assembly of South Korea formed a Committee for the Inspection of Property of Japan Collaborators. The aim was to reclaim property inappropriately gained by cooperation with the Japanese government during colonialization. The project was expected to satisfy Koreans' demands that property acquired by collaborators under the Japanese colonial authorities be returned. Chinilpa is often identified with "Nazi collaborators" (나치 협력자) or "fascists" (파시스트).

2019 boycott of Japanese products in South Korea

In August 2019, Seoul, the capital of South Korea, had planned to install more than 1,000 anti-Japan banners across the city in a move to support the country's ongoing boycott against Japanese products. At that time, liberal Democratic Party of Korea, which was negative about 'Japanese imperialism', was the ruling party in Seoul city. The banners featured the word “NO,” in Korean, with the red circle of the Japanese flag representing the “O”. The banners also contained the phrases “I won’t go to Japan” and “I won’t buy Japanese products.” However, after 50 banners were installed, the city had to reverse course and apologize amid conservative criticism that the campaign would further strain the relationship between South Korea and Japan.

Feminist movements
Feminist movement in South Korea also often has anti-Japanese sentiment. This was naturally formed by war crimes committed by the Japanese Empire during the past World War II, such as Korean Women's Volunteer Labour Corps, Comfort Women, etc. South Korea's far-right conservative-biased media accuse feminist schoolteachers of anti-Japanese education.

However, South Korean feminists actively interact with Japanese feminists. Japanese society antagonizes its feminist movement by calling it "anti-Jepanese" because South Korean and Japanese feminist movements is related to the issue of war crimes against Korean women committed by Japan in the past.

See also
Anti-Imperialism
Anti-Korean sentiment
Anti-Japaneseism
Anti-Japanese propaganda
Anti-Japanese sentiment in China
Anti-Chinese sentiment in Korea
Anti-Japanese sentiment in the United States
Anti-French sentiment#Algeria
Anti-German sentiment#In Israel
Anti-German sentiment#Poland
Anti-British sentiment#Ireland
Ethnic issues in Japan
Japan–Korea disputes
Boycotts of Japanese products
Japan–South Korea trade dispute
Liberalism in South Korea
386 Generation
National liberalism
Voluntary Agency Network of Korea
Censorship of Japanese media in South Korea
Anti-Korean sentiment in Japan

Notes

References

External links
Why South Korea is so obsessed with Japan

 
Korea
 
Feminism in South Korea
Japan–Korea relations
Japanese war crimes
Left-wing nationalism in South Korea
Liberalism in South Korea
Postcolonialism